The 37th Academy of Country Music Awards were held on May 22, 2002 at for the first time was held at the Universal Amphitheatre, in Los Angeles, California . The ceremony was hosted by ACM Award winner, Reba McEntire. This would be the final ceremony to be held at the Universal Amphitheatre.

Winners and nominees 
Winners are shown in bold.

References 

Academy of Country Music Awards
Academy of Country Music Awards
Academy of Country Music Awards
Academy of Country Music Awards
Academy of Country Music Awards
Academy of Country Music Awards